WDVI (100.5 FM) is a country music radio station in Rochester, New York. The station is owned and operated by iHeartMedia.  Its studios are located at the Five Star Bank Plaza building in downtown Rochester, and its transmitter site is in Victor, New York.

Monday through Saturday mornings, WDVI runs The Bobby Bones Show, based in Nashville, from Premiere Networks, a subsidiary of iHeartMedia.

History
100.5 was previously known as WVOR-FM, a hot adult contemporary music station for many years. The station was owned by the Lincoln Group before being sold to American Radio Systems (ARS), a forerunner of CBS Radio. ARS was forced to sell the station to Jacor to meet Federal Communications Commission (FCC) ownership restrictions. Jacor would later be absorbed by Clear Channel (now iHeartMedia).

WVOR-FM rebranded from "Mix 100.5" to "The Drive" in 2006, leaning its direction towards Adult album alternative, and changed its callsign to WDVI; the WVOR calls would be placed on sister station WISY, in nearby Canandaigua.  The station remained a Mediabase hot adult contemporary reporter, however.  The AAA lean was dropped in 2012.

On June 30, 2017, at 5 p.m., WDVI returned to its previous brand as "Mix 100.5". It shifted to adult contemporary on August 3, 2020, while keeping the "Mix" branding.

On October 25, 2021, at 9 a.m., after playing "Drift Away" by Uncle Kracker featuring Dobie Gray, WDVI flipped to country, branded as "Country 100.5", with the first song being "Famous Friends" by Chris Young and Kane Brown. Along with the format change, the station brought in Jeremy Newman, the popular former morning show host from rival station WBEE-FM, to host middays, and the syndicated Bobby Bones morning show was moved to the station from sister station WNBL, however, it remained being simulcast on WNBL until July 1, 2022, when it flipped to all '80s hits.

Previous logos

References

External links

DVI
Country radio stations in the United States
IHeartMedia radio stations